The MLB Little League Classic is an annual Major League Baseball (MLB) game held in Williamsport, Pennsylvania, first played during the 2017 Little League World Series. The series is part of MLB's effort to get more children interested in and involved with baseball at a younger age.

History

Background
After the success of the Fort Bragg Game between the Miami Marlins and Atlanta Braves at Fort Bragg, North Carolina, in July 2016, reports spread that MLB was planning another similar event in Williamsport, Pennsylvania, which is the venue town for the annual Little League World Series and home to the Williamsport Crosscutters, then of Minor League Baseball. Many locals of the area and reporters across the nation thought it was almost impossible due to the size and capacity of Bowman Field, as seating for fewer than 3,000 fans seems much less than ideal for an MLB game. As the reports were dispelled by many, the news faded. However, a St. Louis Post-Dispatch column in early March 2017 stated that MLB was finalizing plans for the game.

On March 9, 2017, MLB officially announced the first MLB Little League Classic, selecting the Pittsburgh Pirates and St. Louis Cardinals as the participants, and released the following statement:

"Major League Baseball's greatest responsibility is to ensure that today's youth become active participants in our game as players and fans. The 'MLB Little League Classic' exemplifies our entire sport's commitment to building a stronger connection between young people and the National Pastime. Our players will honor the great tradition of the Little League World Series and create lifelong memories for the Little Leaguers, their families and the city of Williamsport. I thank the Pirates and the Cardinals, Little League Baseball, Governor Wolf, the Crosscutters, the City of Williamsport, and ESPN for helping us organize an unforgettable weekend." — Rob Manfred, Commissioner of Baseball

Prior to the inaugural game, funding from MLB and grants from the Commonwealth of Pennsylvania given to the City of Williamsport provided more than $4 million to improve Bowman Field.  These included adding new seats, padding around the infield fence, new irrigation and draining to the field itself, moving the bullpens out beyond the outfield fence, new dugouts closer to home plate, and improved dining areas.

Games

The Pirates defeated the Cardinals, 6–3, in the first Classic, played on August 20, 2017. Residents from Lycoming County were eligible to win a very limited number of tickets to the game via a lottery system found on the MLB website. The game was originally scheduled to be a home game for the Pirates; ticket holders for that game were offered a food-and-beverage credit, tickets to another game, or a refund. The Cardinals and Pirates wore special uniforms, including features such as pullover jerseys with bright colors and contrasting sleeves, specially colored caps, and a unique logo that drew design cues from the official logos of both MLB and Little League Baseball. In addition, players were encouraged (although not required) to put nicknames on the jerseys' rear nameplates. These uniforms were worn again by both teams on August 25–27 for Players Weekend, an initiative of MLB and the Major League Baseball Players Association that saw all 30 MLB teams wear similar uniforms.

In late September 2017, MLB announced that a second Classic would be held in 2018, between the New York Mets and Philadelphia Phillies. On August 19, 2018, the Mets won the second Classic, 8–2. The Phillies had last played at Bowman Field on July 31, 1962, when the team lost to the Williamsport Grays, the Phillies' Eastern League affiliate, in a mid-season exhibition game.

The third Classic was played on August 18, 2019, with the Chicago Cubs defeating the Pirates, 7–1. Chicago's uniforms for the game read "Cubbies" on the front, while Pittsburgh's read "The Burgh".

The fourth edition was announced for August 23, 2020, between the Boston Red Sox and the Baltimore Orioles, and was to be the first Classic with American League teams. The game was cancelled, due to the COVID-19 pandemic, with a Boston–Baltimore matchup in Williamsport later scheduled for 2022. The limited 60-game regular season schedule of the 2020 season did include a four-game series between the Red Sox and Orioles on August 20–23, which was played in its entirety at Oriole Park at Camden Yards.

The game of August 22, 2021, when the Cleveland Indians defeated the Los Angeles Angels, 3–0, became the first edition contested between American League teams and the fourth overall edition played. The teams were issued uniforms corresponding to the Little League regions they are based in: the Great Lakes Region for Cleveland and the West Region for Los Angeles. Joe Maddon, managing the Angels, had previously managed the Cubs in the 2019 edition of the game.

The Red Sox and Orioles, originally scheduled to play during the 2020 season, played the fifth edition of the Classic on August 21, 2022. The teams wore standard uniforms. The Orioles won the game, 5–3, largely powered by a three-run double in the bottom of the eighth inning by Jorge Mateo.

On August 21, 2022, MLB announced that the Washington Nationals would host the Philadelphia Phillies in the Classic on August 20, 2023.

Games

Broadcasting

Television

The game has been televised annually as an edition of ESPN's Sunday Night Baseball; this creates a further synergy with the LLWS, as it is also televised by ESPN.

Radio

See also
List of neutral site regular season Major League Baseball games played in the United States and Canada

Notes

References

Baseball in Pennsylvania
Recurring sporting events established in 2017
Annual events in Major League Baseball